The men's decathlon event at the 1970 British Commonwealth Games was held on 21 and 22 July at the Meadowbank Stadium in Edinburgh, Scotland.

Results

References

Day 1 results (p11)
Day 2 results (p9)

Athletics at the 1970 British Commonwealth Games
1970